The Cantwell Formation is a geologic formation in Alaska. It preserves fossils dating back to the Cretaceous period, it has also yielded numerous dinosaur tracks at Denali National Park. Contemporary therizinosaurid and hadrosaurid trackways in the formation indicate that the area was once a major point of immigration between Asia and North America during the Late Cretaceous for many families of dinosaur. Fossil plants similar to water lilies found in the same area suggest the area was a wetland or marsh, with ponds and other large standing bodies of water.  

Footprints discovered in the formation include those of theropods, hadrosaurs, ceratopsians, ankylosaurs, pterosaurs and birds, notably the Magnoavipes denaliensis.

See also

 List of fossiliferous stratigraphic units in Alaska
 Paleontology in Alaska

References

Cretaceous Alaska